Arthur Reuben Gale (16 November 1904 – 13 July 1976) was an English footballer who played as a forward in the Football League for Bury, West Bromwich Albion, Chester and Accrington Stanley.

Life and career
Gale was born in 1904 in Salford. He played football for South Salford Lads' Club and Sedgley Park, from where he signed for First Division club Bury. He made his debut in 1926, but played infrequently for the first team39 appearances spread over five seasons of which two-thirds were in 1928–29and spent the 1930–31 season at Chester. In that season Gale scored more than 100 goals, of which no fewer than 73 goals came in Cheshire League matches. Chester were elected to the Football League for the 1931–32 season, and were willing to pay Bury the £400 fee, but he was sold instead to First Division club West Bromwich Albion, who as part of the deal allowed their player Frank Cresswell to rejoin Chester.

He remained a fringe player at West Bromwich Albion, and the club encouraged him to continue in his chosen profession, as a schoolteacher in the Manchester area. He did however play a major role in their progress to the 1935 FA Cup Final. He came into the team in place of the injured Tommy Glidden, and scored in each round from third to sixth, but was dropped in favour of Glidden for the final, which Albion lost to Sheffield Wednesday. After five-and-a-half seasons during which he made 23 league appearances and scored 18 league goals, he returned to Chester.

Less prolific and less of a regular in the side than before, Gale still produced 16 goals from 35 matches in the Third Division North11 from 16 in the 1937–38 seasonbefore moving back to the Cheshire League with Macclesfield in October 1938. He finished as their top scorer for 1938–39, and earned himself a return to the Football League with Accrington Stanley, but did not play a league game before competitive football was abandoned for the duration of the war. He played and scored in the wartime competitions for Altrincham, and went on to act as the club's reserve team manager, first-team coach, assistant first-team manager and scout.

Gale became head of Lower Kersal Council School in Salford, where one of his pupils was the mountaineer Don Whillans. He died in 1976 in Trafford at the age of 71.

References

1904 births
1976 deaths
People from Salford
English footballers
Association football forwards
Bury F.C. players
Chester City F.C. players
West Bromwich Albion F.C. players
Macclesfield Town F.C. players
Accrington Stanley F.C. (1891) players
Altrincham F.C. players
English Football League players